Eric Ofori Antwi (born 30 October 1994) is a Ghanaian professional footballer who plays as a goalkeeper for Legon Cities in the Ghana Premier League. In 2013, coach Sellas Tetteh called him up as a number one goalkeeper and to be a member of the Ghana national under-20 football team for the 2013 African Youth Championship and for the 2013 FIFA U-20 World Cup.

Club career 
Eric Ofori Antwi signed for professional football club Amidaus Professionals on 1 January 2012. In January 2015, Eric Ofori Antwi signed for professional football club Asante Kotoko from Amidaus Professionals.

International career
In 2013, He was appointed as the number one goalkeeper of the Ghana national under-20 football team for the 2013 African Youth Championship and was crowned as the Most Valuable Player (MVP) and for the 2013 FIFA U-20 World Cup.

Titles and honours

International
Ghana U-20
 African Youth Championship Runner-up: 2013
FIFA U-20 World Cup Third place: 2013

Individual
 Most Valuable Player (MVP) 2013 African Youth Championship

Career stats

Club 

1African competitions include the CAF Champions League and the CAF Confederations Cup.
2Other tournaments include none to date.

References

External links
 Eric Ofori Antwi at Sports Illustrated

1994 births
Living people
Association football goalkeepers
Ghanaian footballers
Asante Kotoko S.C. players
Medeama SC players
Ghana Premier League players
Ghana under-20 international footballers
2013 African U-20 Championship players
Place of birth missing (living people)
People from Tamale, Ghana